Rudolf Goldschmid Sonneborn (June 22, 1898 – June 1, 1986) was an oil executive, businessman, and onetime president of The State of Israel Bond Drive

In 1919 (aged 20) Rudolf visited Palestine from January to August, acting as the 'Secretary to the Zionist Commission'.  He was investigating the feasibility of creating an independent Jewish State of Israel on its territory, achieved 29 years later on May 14, 1948. A detailed account of his trip was recorded in 'Letters Home'.

On July 1, 1945, David Ben-Gurion asked a small gathering of American-Jewish activists at Mr. Sonneborn's apartment to send supplies to the Jewish community and its military force, the Haganah. The group became a secretive, nationwide organization led by Mr. Sonnenborn, Materials for Israel, also known as the Sonneborn Institute. Sonneborn was the fourth husband of New York Post owner and publisher Dorothy Schiff, a granddaughter of the American financier Jacob Schiff.

References

1898 births
1986 deaths
Arms traders
Zionists
Haganah
American Jews
20th-century American businesspeople